Olivia Cheng may refer to 

Olivia Cheng (Canadian actress)
Olivia Cheng (Hong Kong actress)